Lake Massabesic or Massabesic Lake is a lake in southern New Hampshire, United States, covering about  (equivalent to about ) within the city of Manchester and the town of Auburn. Because it provides drinking water for Manchester, swimming and water skiing are not allowed there. Popular sports on the lake are sailing, fishing, and kayaking. The recreational trails along the lake provide views of the lake and the town of Auburn.

Besides flowing into the Manchester water system, the lake's water feeds Cohas Brook, leading to the Merrimack River. Massabesic is a Native American name meaning "place of much water" or "near the great brook."

The lake is classified as a cold- and warmwater fishery.

See also

List of lakes in New Hampshire

References

Auburn, New Hampshire, by Carl Forsaith

External links
"Lake Massabesic Watershed", Manchester Water Works website
"Lake Massabesic Depth Contour Map", Manchester Water Works

Lakes of Hillsborough County, New Hampshire
Lakes of Rockingham County, New Hampshire
Manchester, New Hampshire
Auburn, New Hampshire
Tourist attractions in Manchester, New Hampshire
New Hampshire placenames of Native American origin